Farnhamville is a city in Calhoun and Webster counties in the U.S. state of Iowa. The population was 383 at the time of the 2020 census.

History
Farnhamville was platted in 1881 under the name Farnham, named in honor of R. E. Farnham, a railroad official. Postal authorities refused to accept the name Farnham, so town was renamed Farnhamville when the post office opened later in 1881. Farnhamville was incorporated as a city in 1892.

Geography
Farnhamville is located at  (42.276421, -94.406493).

Demographics

2010 census
As of the census of 2010, there were 371 people, 180 households, and 111 families living in the city. The racial makeup of the city was 98.4% White, 0.3% Native American, 0.3% Asian, 0.3% Pacific Islander, and 0.8% from two or more races.

There were 180 households, of which 23.9% had children under the age of 18 living with them, 46.1% were married couples living together, 8.3% had a female householder with no husband present, 7.2% had a male householder with no wife present, and 38.3% were non-families. 34.4% of all households were made up of individuals, and 18.9% had someone living alone who was 65 years of age or older. The average household size was 2.06 and the average family size was 2.53.

The median age in the city was 46.8 years. 18.6% of residents were under the age of 18; 8.9% were between the ages of 18 and 24; 20.8% were from 25 to 44; 27.5% were from 45 to 64; and 24.3% were 65 years of age or older. The gender makeup of the city was 46.4% male and 53.6% female.

2000 census
As of the census of 2000, there were 430 people, 195 households, and 130 families living in the city. The racial makeup of the city was 98.14% White, 0.70% Native American, 0.47% from other races, and 0.70% from two or more races. Hispanic or Latino of any race were 0.70% of the population.

There were 195 households, out of which 26.7% had children under the age of 18 living with them, 54.9% were married couples living together, 9.2% had a female householder with no husband present, and 33.3% were non-families. 30.8% of all households were made up of individuals, and 23.6% had someone living alone who was 65 years of age or older. The average household size was 2.21 and the average family size was 2.69.

Age spread:  23.0% under the age of 18, 7.7% from 18 to 24, 20.5% from 25 to 44, 23.3% from 45 to 64, and 25.6% who were 65 years of age or older. The median age was 44 years. For every 100 females, there were 86.1 males. For every 100 females age 18 and over, there were 87.0 males.

The median income for a household in the city was $29,107, and the median income for a family was $36,667. Males had a median income of $27,237 versus $22,813 for females. The per capita income for the city was $21,619. About 7.1% of families and 10.0% of the population were below the poverty line, including 11.2% of those under age 18 and 15.7% of those age 65 or over.

Education
Farnhamville is served by the Prairie Valley Community School District, which formed on July 1, 1993 with the merger of the Cedar Valley Community School District and the Prairie Community School District.

References

Cities in Calhoun County, Iowa
Cities in Webster County, Iowa
Cities in Iowa